Nils Bergström (17 November 1898 – 27 January 1988) was a Swedish long-distance runner. He competed in the men's 5000 metres at the 1920 Summer Olympics.

References

External links
 

1898 births
1988 deaths
Athletes (track and field) at the 1920 Summer Olympics
Swedish male long-distance runners
Olympic athletes of Sweden
Place of birth missing